Vladimir Ribić (born 28 March 1981) is a Serbian former footballer who played as a striker.

Career
While playing for Bežanija, Ribić became the Serbian League Belgrade top scorer in the 2002–03 season with 21 goals in 30 appearances, helping the club win promotion back to the Second League of Serbia and Montenegro. He was subsequently transferred to First League of Serbia and Montenegro side Radnički Obrenovac for the 2003–04 season.

After moving abroad, Ribić totaled just 18 appearances and scored one goal for Arsenal Kyiv in the Ukrainian Premier League over the course of four seasons (2003–04 to 2006–07). He subsequently played with Kairat in the Kazakhstan Premier League for two seasons (2007 and 2008), making 38 appearances and scoring three goals.

Honours
Bežanija
 Serbian League Belgrade: 2002–03

References

External links
 
 
 

1981 births
Living people
Footballers from Belgrade
Serbia and Montenegro footballers
Serbian footballers
Association football forwards
FK Bežanija players
FK Radnički Obrenovac players
FC Arsenal Kyiv players
FC Kairat players
FK Čukarički players
Vladimir Ribic
Second League of Serbia and Montenegro players
First League of Serbia and Montenegro players
Ukrainian Premier League players
Kazakhstan Premier League players
Serbian SuperLiga players
Azadegan League players
Serbia and Montenegro expatriate footballers
Serbian expatriate footballers
Expatriate footballers in Ukraine
Expatriate footballers in Kazakhstan
Expatriate footballers in Iran
Expatriate footballers in Thailand
Serbia and Montenegro expatriate sportspeople in Ukraine
Serbian expatriate sportspeople in Ukraine
Serbian expatriate sportspeople in Kazakhstan
Serbian expatriate sportspeople in Iran
Serbian expatriate sportspeople in Thailand